Wyeth House may refer to:

 John Wyeth House, in Cambridge, Massachusetts
 Wyeth Brickyard Superintendent's House, in Cambridge, Massachusetts
 Wyeth-Smith House, in Cambridge, Massachusetts
 Peter and Henriette Wyeth Hurd House, in San Patricio, New Mexico
 Dr. Jacob Geiger House-Maud Wyeth Painter House, in St. Joseph, Missouri
 N. C. Wyeth House and Studio, in Chadds Ford Township, Pennsylvania

See also
 Wyeth Flats
 Wyeth (disambiguation)

Architectural disambiguation pages